"No Promises" is a song recorded by American DJ group Cheat Codes. It features vocals by American singer and songwriter Demi Lovato as well as Trevor Dahl, a member of the group. The song was released on March 31, 2017, and debuted on mainstream radio in the United States on April 11, 2017. "No Promises" was written by the group members, along with Lovato, Lauv, and Loote, who co-produced the song with group member Trevor Dahl and Leff, while Mitch Allan produced its vocals. The track reached number one in Israel, the top 10 in Flanders, Latvia, Malaysia, and Poland, as well as the top 20 in Australia, Ireland, New Zealand, Portugal, Scotland, and the United Kingdom, and the top 30 in Denmark, Hungary, and Serbia. The song is also certified Platinum in the US, UK, and six other countries. An acoustic version of the song is included on the deluxe version of Lovato's sixth album Tell Me You Love Me.

Composition
"No Promises" is a house song written in the key of B major with a tempo of 113 beats per minute in common time. The song follows a chord progression of E–Gm–B, and the vocals in the song span from C4 to G5.

Music video
The music video was released on May 16, 2017, on Cheat Codes' YouTube channel and was directed by American director Hannah Lux Davis.

Live performances
Cheat Codes and Lovato performed the song on The Tonight Show Starring Jimmy Fallon on May 22, 2017. Later it was performed on Good Morning America summer concert series on August 18, 2017. Lovato performed the track during their sixth headlining concert tour Tell Me You Love Me World Tour.

Track listing
Digital download
 "No Promises" (featuring Demi Lovato) – 3:43

Digital download 
 "No Promises" (Club Edit) – 4:45
 "No Promises" (Ashworth Remix) – 3:19
 "No Promises" (Hook n Sling Remix) – 4:17
 "No Promises" (Eden Prince) – 3:08
 "No Promises" (Bassjackers) – 3:50

Digital download 
 "No Promises" (Stripped Version) – 3:26

Digital download 
 "No Promises (Acoustic Version)” - 3:52

Charts

Weekly charts

Year-end charts

Certifications

Release history

References

2017 songs
2017 singles
Cheat Codes (DJs) songs
Music videos directed by Hannah Lux Davis
Parlophone singles
Songs written by Lauv
Songs written by Demi Lovato
Song recordings produced by Mitch Allan